KESO (92.7 FM) is a radio station broadcasting a Spanish Christian radio format. Licensed to South Padre Island, Texas, United States, the station serves the McAllen-Brownsville-Harlingen area.  The station is currently owned by MBM Texas Valley LLC.

Previously known as "Alternative 92.7" and "Digital 92.7", the station recently simulcast the Regional Mexican programming of XHRR.

History
The station was assigned the call letters KOUA on 1989-09-26.  On 1989-10-12, the station changed its call sign to KJIB and again on 1995-12-18 to the current KESO.

Former Logo

References

External links
R Communications Rio Grande Valley Radio

ESO
Classic hits radio stations in the United States
Radio stations established in 1989